The Cheshire Cat ( or ) is a  fictional cat popularised by Lewis Carroll in Alice's Adventures in Wonderland and known for its distinctive mischievous grin. While now most often used in Alice-related contexts, the association of a "Cheshire cat" with grinning predates the 1865 book. It has transcended the context of literature and become enmeshed in popular culture, appearing in various forms of media, from political cartoons to television, as well as in cross-disciplinary studies, from business to science. One distinguishing feature of the Alice-style Cheshire Cat involves a periodic gradual disappearance of its body, leaving only one last visible trace: its iconic grin. He belongs to the Duchess.

Origins
The first known appearance of the expression in literature is in the 18th century, in Francis Grose's A Classical Dictionary of the Vulgar Tongue, Second, Corrected and Enlarged Edition (1788), which contains the following entry: 

The phrase appears again in print in John Wolcot's pseudonymous Peter Pindar's Pair of Lyric Epistles (1792):

The phrase also appears in print in William Makepeace Thackeray's novel The Newcomes (1855):

There are numerous theories about the origin of the phrase "grinning like a Cheshire Cat" in English history. A possible origin of the phrase is one favoured by the people of Cheshire, a county in England which boasts numerous dairy farms; hence the cats grin because of the abundance of milk and cream.

In 1853, Samuel Maunder offered this explanation:

According to Brewer's Dictionary (1870), "The phrase has never been satisfactorily accounted for, but it has been said that cheese was formerly sold in Cheshire moulded like a cat that looked as though it was grinning". The cheese was cut from the tail end, so that the last part eaten was the head of the smiling cat. A later edition of Brewer's adds another interesting explanation. It was that a painter in Cheshire once used to paint grinning lions on inns. The connection between cats and lions is obvious and the dictionary does not go on to explain this.

A survey published in 2015 showed how highly fanciful were many purported explanations seen on the internet.

Lewis Carroll's character
The Cheshire Cat is now largely identified with the character of the same name in Lewis Carroll's 1865 novel Alice's Adventures in Wonderland. Alice first encounters the Cheshire Cat at the Duchess's house in her kitchen, and later on the branches of a tree, where it appears and disappears at will, and engages Alice in amusing but sometimes perplexing conversation. The cat sometimes raises philosophical points that annoy or baffle Alice; but appears to cheer her when it appears suddenly at the Queen of Hearts' croquet field; and when sentenced to death, baffles everyone by having made its head appear without its body, sparking a debate between the executioner and the King and Queen of Hearts about whether a disembodied head can indeed be beheaded. At one point, the cat disappears gradually until nothing is left but its grin, prompting Alice to remark that "she has often seen a cat without a grin but never a grin without a cat".

Oxford professor E.B. Pusey
The scholar David Day has proposed Lewis Carroll's cat was Edward Bouverie Pusey, Oxford professor of Hebrew and Carroll's mentor. 
The name Pusey was suggested by Alice's deferential address of the cat as "Cheshire Puss". Pusey was an authority on the fathers of the Christian Church, and in Carroll's time Pusey was known as the Patristic Catenary (or chain), after the chain of authority of Church patriarchs.

As a mathematician, Carroll would have been well familiar with the other meaning of catenary: the curve of a horizontally-suspended chain, which suggests the shape of the cat's grin.

Source of imagery

There is a suggestion that Carroll found inspiration for the name and expression of the Cheshire Cat in the 16th century sandstone carving of a grinning cat, on the west face of St Wilfrid's Church tower in Grappenhall, a village  from his birthplace in Daresbury, Cheshire.

Carroll wrote in his memoirs that he "saw a Cheshire cat with a gigantic smile at Brimstage carved into the wall". This refers to a roughly-cut corbel in Brimstage Hall, Wirral (previously in Cheshire) which resembles a smiling cat. This is another possible inspiration for the character.

Lewis Carroll's father, Reverend Charles Dodgson, was Rector of Croft and Archdeacon of Richmond in North Yorkshire, England, from 1843 to 1868; Carroll lived here from 1843 to 1850. Some historians believe Lewis Carroll's Cheshire Cat in Alice in Wonderland was inspired by a carving in Croft church.

Another possible inspiration was the British Shorthair: Carroll saw a representative British Shorthair illustrated on a label of Cheshire cheese. The Cat Fanciers' Association profile reads: “When gracelessness is observed, the British Shorthair is duly embarrassed, quickly recovering with a 'Cheshire cat smile'”.

In 1992, members of the Lewis Carroll Society attributed it to a gargoyle found on a pillar in St Nicolas's Church, Cranleigh, where Carroll used to travel frequently when he lived in Guildford (though this is doubtful, as he moved to Guildford some three years after Alice's Adventures in Wonderland had been published) and a carving in a church in the village of Croft-on-Tees, in the north east of England, where his father had been rector.

Carroll is believed to have visited St Christopher's church in Pott Shrigley, Cheshire, which has a stone sculpture resembling the pictorial cat in the book.

Adaptations
The Cheshire Cat character has been re-depicted by other creators and used as the inspiration for new characters, primarily in screen media (film, television, video games) and print media (literature, comics, art). Other non-media contexts that embrace the Cheshire Cat include music, business, and science.

Prior to 1951 when Walt Disney released an animated adaptation of the story (see below), there were few post-Alice allusions to the character. Martin Gardner, author of The Annotated Alice, wondered if T. S. Eliot had the Cheshire Cat in mind when writing Morning at the Window, but notes no other significant allusions in the pre-war period.

Images of and references to the Cheshire Cat cropped up with increasing frequency in the 1960s and 1970s, along with more frequent references to Carroll's works in general. (See generally the lyrics to White Rabbit by the rock group Jefferson Airplane). The Cheshire Cat appeared on LSD blotters, as well as in song lyrics and popular fiction.

In Disney's 1951 animated film, Alice in Wonderland, the Cheshire Cat is depicted as an intelligent and mischievous character that sometimes helps Alice and sometimes gets her into trouble. He frequently sings the first verse of the Jabberwocky poem. The animated character was voiced by Sterling Holloway (Alice in Wonderland) and Jim Cummings (2004–present).

In the 1985 television adaptation of Carroll's books, the Cheshire Cat is portrayed by Telly Savalas. He sings a morose song called "There's No Way Home", which simply drives Alice to try and find a way home even more.

In the 1999 television adaptation of Carroll's books, the Cheshire Cat is portrayed by Whoopi Goldberg. She acts as an ally and friend to Alice.

The Cheshire Cat appears in Walt Disney's 2010 Alice in Wonderland, directed by Tim Burton. British actor Stephen Fry voices the character. In the film, Cheshire (as he is often called; or sometimes "Ches") binds the wound Alice suffered earlier by the Bandersnatch and guides her to Tarrant Hightopp, the Mad Hatter and Thackery Earwicket, the March Hare. He is blamed by the Hatter for desertion when the White Queen is deposed by the Red; but later impersonates the Hatter when the latter is sentenced to decapitation. Throughout his appearances, "Ches" is able to make himself intangible or weightless, as well as invisible (and thus to survive decapitation), and is usually depicted in mid-air, at shoulder-height to human-sized characters. In the video game adaptation of the movie, "Ches" is a playable character who can not only turn himself invisible, but other objects around him as well.

In October 2019, it was reported that an undetermined Cheshire Cat project is being developed by Disney for its streaming service, Disney+.

In Alice's Wonderland Bakery, a series set several generations after the Disney film, the Cheshire Cat, voiced by Max Mittelman, is depicted as an immortal, being the only character besides the Doorknob not to be represented through a descendant.

Cross-screen comparison
Each major film adaptation of Lewis Carroll's tale represents the Cheshire Cat character and his traits uniquely. 

In addition to the Cheshire Cat's appearances in films central to its Lewis Carroll origins, the Cheshire Cat has been featured in other cinematic works. The late filmmaker Chris Marker gave his monumental documentary on the New Left movement of 1967–1977, Le fond de l'air est rouge (1977), the English title Grin without a Cat. Like the original, it signifies that revolution was in the air, but failed to take root. In the film, it is also stated: a spearhead without a spear, a grin without a cat. A later Marker film, Chats perchés (2004) (The Case of the Grinning Cat in English), examined the context of M. Chat street art in France. 

The Cheshire Cat has been seen by television audiences in a broadcast spin-off. The Cheshire Cat appears in Once Upon a Time in Wonderland (a spin-off of Once Upon a Time) voiced by Keith David. While looking for the Mad Hatter's house from the trees, Alice encounters the Cheshire Cat in giant form where the Red Queen had promised him that Alice would be good food for him. They end up engaging each other in combat until the Knave of Hearts arrives and throws a piece of one mushroom side into his mouth, which shrinks the Cat back to normal size, and he leaves.

Video games
The Cheshire Cat appears as an avatar character in the video games American McGee's Alice (2000); and the sequel Alice: Madness Returns (2011), the Cheshire Cat is portrayed as an enigmatic and snarky, yet wise guide for Alice in the corrupted Wonderland. In keeping with the twisted tone of the game, the Cheshire Cat is mangy and emaciated in appearance. His voice was provided by Roger L. Jackson, who also voiced the Mad Hatter and The Jabberwock in the game.

The Cheshire Cat appears in Sunsoft's 2006 mobile game , serving as the guide to Ariko (the "Alice" of the game) and helps her chase after The White Rabbit. In the game, Cheshire Cat is portrayed with a humanoid body and wears a long gray cloak with a red-string bell around his neck, leaving only his nose, razor-sharp teeth, and wide grin visible. In Wonderland, Cheshire Cat is the "Guide", an important role that makes him feared by the other residents, and is compelled by Ariko's inner will to help her unlock her suppressed, traumatic memories and overcome her suicidal depression. Later in the game, Cheshire Cat gets beheaded by the Queen Of Hearts, but is still alive and his body is able to move on its own. Due to the White Rabbit's deranged state, Cheshire Cat fulfills his role of absorbing Ariko's negative emotions, though the task puts a large strain on him.

The Cheshire Cat appears in Heart no Kuni no Alice, a dating sim game and its related media, as a young man named "Boris Airay", with cat-like attributes such as a tail and cat ears, and is one of the many love interests for Alice in Wonderland.

Other media
In the third volume of Shazam!, the Cheshire Cat is shown to live in the Magiclands location called the Wozenderlands. When the Scarecrow and the Munchkins were taking Billy Batson, Mary Bromfield, and C.C. Batson to Dorothy Gale, the Cheshire Cat appeared near the Blue Brick Road. He went on the attack only to be fought off by Shazam and Lady Shazam.

In science
Cheshire Cat is used as a metaphor to describe several scientific phenomena:

 The Cheshire Cat effect, as described by Sally Duensing and Bob Miller, is a binocular rivalry which causes stationary objects seen in one eye to disappear from view when an object in motion crosses in front of the other eye. 

 In another scientific context, catalytic RNAs have been deemed Cheshire cats. This metaphor is used to describe the fading of the ribonucleotide construct, which leaves behind a smile of only the mineral components of the RNA catalyst.

 Similarly, the Cheshire Cat has been used out of its traditional context to help define another scientific phenomenon, the "Cheshire Cat" escape strategy. When Coccolithophore – a species of successful ocean algae – is able to resist the haploid phase of its life cycle it escapes meiosis and its dominant diploid genes are passed on in a virus-free environment, freeing the host from the danger of infection during reproduction. The algae escape death (beheading) by means of disappearance (vanishing his head):

 Other gestures to the Cheshire Cat's tropes of disappearance and mystique have been seen in scientific literature coming from the field of Physics. "The Cheshire Cat" is a phenomenon in quantum mechanics in which a particle and its property behave as if they are separated, or when a particle separates from one of its physical properties. To test this idea, researchers used an interferometer where neutron beams passed through silicon crystal. The crystal physically separated the neutrons and allowed them to go to two paths. Researchers reported "the system behaves as if the neutrons go through one beam path, while their magnetic moment travels along the other."

 The Cheshire cat's grin has inspired scientists in their naming of visual phenomena. A merger of galaxy groups in the constellation Ursa Major is nicknamed "Cheshire Cat galaxy group" by Astronomers due to its suggestive appearance.

 In linguistics, cheshirization, when a sound disappears but leaves a trace, just like the cat disappears but leaves his grin.

 In Conway's Game of Life, the Cheshire Cat is a cat-like pattern which transforms into a grin in the second to last generation and a block (pawprint) in the last generation.

Footnotes

References

Other sources

External links

 
 
 

Lewis Carroll characters
Anthropomorphic cats
Fictional characters who can turn invisible
Fictional tricksters
Cheshire
Fictional characters who can teleport
Literary characters introduced in 1865
Male characters in film
Male characters in literature
Fantasy creatures
Cats in literature